Laminacauda rubens is a species of sheet weaver found in the Juan Fernández Islands. It was described by Millidge in 1991.

References

Linyphiidae
Spiders described in 1991
Spiders of South America